INS Ranvijay (Victor in War) is a  in active service with the Indian Navy. Ranvijay was commissioned on 15 Jan 1988.

Service history
She has won the prestigious Cock Trophy in the annual Western Fleet whaler boat regatta held at the Naval Dockyard on 7 January 2006.

Ranvijay participated in the multinational Malabar Naval Exercise between Australia, India, Singapore, Japan and United States in the Bay of Bengal.

In July 2014 Ranjivay, accompanied by the stealth frigate  and fleet tanker  took part in the INDRA War Games, a naval and army counter-terrorism exercise with Russia.
In November 2016 Ranjivay, accompanied by the corvette INS Kamorta took part in the SIMBEX War Games, a naval exercise with Singapore Navy which bought the RSN’s stealth frigate, RSS Formidable.

On 23 October 2021, Ranvijay caught fire at the Visakhapatnam Naval Base, in eastern Bengal. Four of her crew were hospitalised.

Awards and recognition
Ranvijay received the best ship of the Eastern Fleet Trophy for the year 2006–07 and 2011–12.

Gallery

References

Rajput-class destroyers
Ships built in the Soviet Union
1986 ships
Destroyers of India
Destroyers of the Cold War
Maritime incidents in 2021